Femoracoelotes is a genus of East Asian funnel weavers first described by X. P. Wang in 2002.  it contains only two species and is endemic to Taiwan.

References

External links

Agelenidae
Araneomorphae genera
Spiders of Taiwan
Endemic fauna of Taiwan